Jean-Rock Gaudreault (born 1972 in Jonquière, Quebec) is a Canadian playwright. He won the Governor General's Award for French-language drama at the 2003 Governor General's Awards for Deux pas vers les étoiles, and was a shortlisted nominee at the 2005 Governor General's Awards for Pour ceux qui croient que la Terre est ronde and at the 2015 Governor General's Awards for Jouez, Monsieur Molière!.

His other plays have included La Raccourcie, La Maladie fantastique, Une maison face au nord, Comment parler de Dieu à un enfant pendant que le monde pleure and Mathieu trop court, François trop long.

He is a graduate of the National Theatre School of Canada.

References

1972 births
21st-century Canadian dramatists and playwrights
Canadian male dramatists and playwrights
Canadian dramatists and playwrights in French
Writers from Saguenay, Quebec
Living people
National Theatre School of Canada alumni
21st-century Canadian male writers